Jokkmokk (or ;) is a locality and the seat of Jokkmokk Municipality in Norrbotten County, province of Lapland, Sweden, with 2,786 inhabitants in 2010. The Lule Sami name of the place (composed of the individual words  and ) means "River's Curve," due to the meandering river that runs through it. As in other towns in Lapland, the Swedish language is dominant at an official level in Jokkmokk in modern times. The settlement is just north of the Arctic Circle. Talvatissjön is located at the southern part of Jokkmokk.

Jokkmokk is an important locality for Sámi people and the location of several institutions related to them, including an education centre, the Ájtte museum, and an office of the Sámi Parliament of Sweden.

Jokkmokk was a transit center for Sami refugees from Norway during World War II, in addition to the centre in Kjesäter.

Jokkmokk Market has been taking place since 1605. On the first Thursday in February every year, thousands of people gather in the town for concerts, exhibitions and trade in one of the most important social events for the Sámi people in Sápmi.

Climate 
Influenced by its inland and northerly position, Jokkmokk's variety of a subarctic climate (Dfc) is very cold by Swedish standards. Summers are normally relatively mild, with midnight sun, and the dark winters are long and cold, although polar night is not quite observed with a sun angle of 0.4° at the winter solstice. This combination makes it the coldest municipal seat in Sweden in terms of winter temperatures, although some rural localities in Lapland are even colder.

See also
Kåbdalis

References

External links 
 Tourist information in Jokkmokk
 Ájtte Museum of Sami people

Populated places in Jokkmokk Municipality
Lapland (Sweden)
Municipal seats of Norrbotten County
Swedish municipal seats
Populated places in Arctic Sweden